is a district located in Tokushima Prefecture, Japan.

Towns and villages
Mugi
Kaiyō
Minami

Municipal timeline
March 31, 2006:  The towns of Kainan, Kaifu and Shishikui merged to form the new town of Kaiyō.  On the same date, the towns of Hiwasa and Yuki merged to form the new town of Minami.

Districts in Tokushima Prefecture